Bernard Morel (born 30 March 1925) is a French fencer. He won a bronze medal in the team sabre event at the 1952 Summer Olympics.

References

External links
 

1925 births
Living people
Sportspeople from Lyon
French male sabre fencers
Olympic fencers of France
Fencers at the 1952 Summer Olympics
Fencers at the 1956 Summer Olympics
Olympic bronze medalists for France
Olympic medalists in fencing
Medalists at the 1952 Summer Olympics
20th-century French people
21st-century French people